A cook-off is a cooking competition where the contestants each prepare dishes for judging either by a select group of judges or by the general public. Cook-offs are very popular among competitors (such as restaurants) with very similar dishes, such as chili, and serves as a way to decide which recipe is the best for that particular dish.

Chili cook-off 

A chili cook-off is a social event, similar to a barbecue, in which competitors prepare their own particular recipe for chili con carne and submit it for taste testing. A cook-off may be an informal gathering with the simple goal of sharing recipes and enjoying food, or it may be a large-scale event with an official panel of judges and substantial prizes for winners.

The Chili Appreciation Society International (CASI) sanctions over 550 cook-offs annually that raise over $1,000,000 for charity. Corporate CASI, which has the function of sanctioning all of these cook-offs, doing the necessary work to tabulate cookoff results, and putting on the annual Terlingua International Chili Championship, has an annual income of approximately $250,000. Out of this annual income around $60,000 goes to charity. The CASI is a 501(c)(3) corporation.

The International Chili Society (ICS) organizes chili cook-offs as fundraisers. Its annual cook-offs are on a grand scale, with regional qualifying events that attract tens of thousands of participants and a "World Championship" cook-off held in October. The ICS has raised millions of dollars for charity while still awarding hundreds of thousands of dollars to winners.

As early as 1970, many communities have hosted non-ICS cook-offs, leading to a competing "World Championship" cook-off in Terlingua, Texas.

The UK Chilli Cook-off Association organises chilli cook-offs as throughout the UK as fundraisers, culminating in the UK grand final at the Upton Cheyney Chili Festival near Bath, UK – Winners qualify for the World Food Championships Chili Cookoff

Many chili cook-offs were either canceled or moved to virtual events because of the COVID-19 pandemic, from 2020 to 2021.

Notable chili cook-offs 
 Chilympiad in San Marcos, Texas (1970–2002)
 Lone Star Chili Cook-off in New York City

Ribfest 

A ribfest is a cook-off typically for pork ribs.

Notable ribfests 
 Canada's Largest Ribfest – Burlington, Ontario
 Best in the West Nugget Rib Cook-off – Sparks, Nevada
 London Ribfest – London, Ontario
 Toronto Ribfest – Etobicoke, Toronto, Ontario, Canada
 Canada's largest Halal Barbeque and Fast Food Truck Festival, Toronto, Ontario

See also 
 The Great British Bake Off, a British television cooking competition series

References

External links 
 Chili Appreciation Society International, a national/international cook-off organizer and promoter of chili for charity
 Piedmont Pepper Pod, the North Carolina subgroup of CASI
 International Chili Society, a major cook-off organizer
 Munich, Germany's long-running chili cook-off
 Lone Star Chili Cook-off Texas style Chili Cook-off in New York City
 American Seafood Cook-off
 NOLA.com
 The Food Experiments, a NYC-based cookoff series
 Mackinac Island Chili Cook-off, held each February on this remote Island in the Upper Midwest
 The UK Chilli Cook-off Association

Food and drink festivals
Cooking competitions